The Hamilton Institute is a multi-disciplinary research centre at Maynooth University, named after William Rowan Hamilton, arguably Ireland's most distinguished mathematician.

The Hamilton Institute was formally established in November 2001 under the first round of funding, by Science Foundation Ireland (SFI). It was officially opened by Bill Harris, SFI Director-General with the inaugural lecture being given by Kevin Warwick. Since 2001 the institute grew to a size to around 45 full-time researchers in 2008. From 2001 until 2014 the institute Director was Prof. Douglas Leith. From 2015 to 2017 Prof. Fiona Lyddy was director and in 2017, Prof. Ken Duffy became the Institute's director.

Since its founding, the institute has been successful in winning a number of large research grants, in addition to the original seed funding grant from SFI, including the €4.7M National Communications Network Research Centre, a €2.5M Systems Biology initiative, the €2.7M Next Generation Internet project, the National Biophotonics Platform and the €2.2M Network Mathematics initiative. The institute was also a partner in the €5.8M SFI funded FAME strategic research cluster announced in 2009. It hosts Maynooth University's students for the SFI Centre for Research Training in Data Analytics and Damien Wood's DNA computing group.

The Hamilton Institute's stated aim is to provide a bridge between mathematics and its applications in ICT and biology. It has organised a number of high profile inter-disciplinary workshops including a successful series of biannual International Workshops on Non-negative Matrices & Their Applications, (run in 2004, 2006 and 2008) and a series of International Workshops on Systems Biology (in 2006 and 2008). The Hamilton Institute has also hosted workshops such as the International Symposium on Positive Systems (POSTA), the International Workshop on Multiple Access Communications (MACOM) and the Traffic Measurement and Analysis Conference.

The Hamilton Institute robotic soccer team were RoboCup World Champions in 2008, and have regularly fielded Robocup teams since.

See also
 Computer networking, esp. transmission Control Protocol, H-TCP, IEEE 802.11
 Hybrid system, esp. stability theory and Lyapunov stability
 Systems biology
 Computational physiology
 Machine learning
 User interfaces for mobile phones

References

External links
 Official Hamilton Institute site
 Maynooth University
 Science Foundation Ireland

Mathematical institutes
Research institutes in the Republic of Ireland
Maynooth University